Montana Kamenga is a congolese recording artist, musician, vocalist and entertainer. At one time, he was a member of the musical band Quartier Latin International, formed and led by Congolese musician Koffi Olomide. In the production Inchallah, Kamenga is the fourth person to sing his solo, behind Fally Ipupa, Bouro Mpela and Soleil Wanga, but ahead of Gibson Butukondolo and Deo Brando.

Discography
Montana Kamenga Discography

See also

References

Date of birth missing (living people)
Living people
People from Kinshasa
21st-century Democratic Republic of the Congo male singers
Democratic Republic of the Congo songwriters
Soukous musicians
Democratic Republic of the Congo musicians
Quartier Latin International
Year of birth missing (living people)